Extended Log Format (ELF) is a standardized text file format that is used by web servers when generating log files. In comparison to the Common Log Format (CLF), ELF provides more information and flexibility.

Example 
#Version: 1.0
#Date: 12-Jan-1996 00:00:00
#Fields: time cs-method cs-uri
00:34:23 GET /foo/bar.html
12:21:16 GET /foo/bar.html
12:45:52 GET /foo/bar.html
12:57:34 GET /foo/bar.html

See also 
 Common Log Format

Sources 
 Extended Log File Format
as described in the documentation of the World Wide Web consortia webserver (W3C httpd).

Computer file formats
Log file formats